Sunfire may refer to:

Sunfire (comics),  a superhero character in Marvel Comics
Sunfire (Exiles), a superheroine character from the Marvel Comics series Exiles
Sunfire (horse), an American Thoroughbred racehorse
Pontiac Sunfire, an automobile manufactured by General Motors
Asuna Sunfire, an automobile manufactured by Isuzu
Sunfire (series), a series of young adult novels
Sun Fire, brand of server computers introduced by Sun Microsystems in 2001